Hasan Basri Güzeloğlu (born 22 September 1964) is a Turkish politician and the incumbent Governor of Kocaeli.

Early life
Güzeloğlu was born on 22 September 1964 in Ankara, the capital of Republic of Turkey. He was educated at different schools of Turkey and attended Faculty of Political Science, Ankara University for higher education.

References

1964 births
Living people
People from Mersin
Turkish politicians
Governors of Kocaeli